The Football League Third Division North and Football League Third Division South were the third tiers of the English football league pyramid from 1921 to 1958, ran by The Football League. It was the highest level where the division was split into more than one league.

From 1954–55 season until 1957–58 season, there was a series of games between teams representing the divisions.

The representative games 

1954–55 - played at Reading F.C. ground on 16 March 1955. Attendance 10,438. South won 2–0.

1955–56 - played at Accrington Stanley F.C. ground on 13 October, 1955. Attendance 10,521. Draw 3–3.

The second half of the match was broadcast on BBC television, which was the first occasion that a match had been televised from Peel Park.

Don Mills scored for the South in the first half. Reg Ryan equalised with a penalty in the second half, followed by goals from John Thomas Connor for the North and Ernie Morgan for the South. The final score was 3–3.

1956–57 - played at Coventry City F.C. ground on 8 October, 1956. Attendance 14,500. South won 2–1.

1956–57 - played at Stockport County F.C. ground on 2 April 1957. Attendance 12,372. Won by North 2–1.

W Holden scored the first goal for the North, which was followed by an equaliser by Neil Langman for the South. Soon after the start of the second half, Ron Greener failed to score for the North from a penalty. The winning goal was scored by Alf Ackerman for the North in the last minute of the game.

1957–58 - played at Crystal Palace F.C. ground on 30 October, 1957. Draw 2–2.

The teams and officials 
The following players and officials were selected to participate in the representative games.

South Vs. North 16 March 1955

The South Team

The North Team

The Officials

North Vs. South 13 October 1955

The North Team

The South Team

Note: Although Peter Hill of Coventry was selected at number 8 for the South, D Mills of Torquay started the game.

The Officials

South Vs. North 8 October 1956

The South Team

The North Team

The Officials

North Vs. South 2 April 1957

The North Team

The South Team

Note: Although Ted Phillips of Ipswich was selected at number 10 for the South, Dorman of Walsall started the game.

The Officials

South Vs. North 30 October 1957

The South Team

The North Team

The Officials

References 

Third Division representative matches
South representative matches
North representative matches
Representative teams of association football leagues